Cold Fact is the debut album from American singer-songwriter Rodriguez. It was released in the United States on the Sussex label in March 1970. The album sold poorly in the United States, but performed better in South Africa and Australia, with Rodriguez touring Australia in 1979.

In 1971 the album was released in South Africa by A&M Records. In 1976, several thousand copies of Cold Fact were found in a New York warehouse and sold out in Australia in a few weeks. It went to No. 23 on the Australian album charts in 1978, staying on the charts for fifty-five weeks. In 1998 Cold Fact was awarded a platinum disc in South Africa, and was five-times platinum in Australia. Rodriguez has since toured South Africa and Australia with much success, but remained relatively unknown in his native country of the US. This began to change after the reissues of his albums in the US by Light in the Attic Records in 2008 and 2009, and even further in 2012 with the Academy Award winning documentary film Searching for Sugar Man, which soon led to appearances on major American television shows like 60 Minutes and The Late Show with David Letterman.

Cold Fact has sold 201,000 since Nielsen SoundScan started tracking in 1991, 173,000 of those after the film opened, 98,000 in the wake of the Oscar win. Coming from Reality has moved 105,000 albums, 99,000 since the movie hit, 60,000 post-Academy Awards. And the soundtrack album (which was picked up by Sony’s Legacy catalog division) boasts 152,000 in sales.

Track listing
All songs written by Sixto Rodriguez, except (5, 10) by Gary Harvey, Mike Theodore and Dennis Coffey.

Personnel
There were no musicians credited on the original album sleeve, but Rodriguez and Mike Theodore have filled in the gaps:

 Rodriguez – vocals, acoustic guitar
 Dennis Coffey – electric guitar, bass
 Mike Theodore – keyboards, brass and string arrangements
 Andrew Smith – drums
 Bob Pangborn – percussion
 Bob Babbitt – bass
 Detroit Symphony (Leader Gordon Staples) – strings
 Leader Carl Reatz – horns (trombones, baritone sax)
 Friends and family of Joyce Vincent and Telma Hopkins – children's choir on "Gommorah"

Technical
 Recorded in Detroit in August and September 1969.
 Arranged and produced by Mike Theodore and Dennis Coffey.
 Engineering by Mike Theodore at Tera-Shirma Studio, Detroit.
 Ray Hall at R.C.A. New York – remix
 Ransier and Anderson – photography
 Nancy Chester (See / Hear! & How!) – cover design

Samples and features
"Sugar Man" was sampled in "You're Da Man", from the 2001 Nas album Stillmatic.

In 2014, the French Deep House and Electro music producer Tristan Casara featured "Hate Street Dialogue" on his album for a new release credited to "The Avener Feat. Rodriguez". The release The Wanderings of the Avener charted in France.

Compilations
"Sugar Man" was the opening track on David Holmes' 2002 compilation Come Get It I Got It.

Chart performance

Certifications

References

External links
 Cold Fact
 Cold Fact Rodriguez

1970 debut albums
Sixto Rodriguez albums
Sussex Records albums
RCA Records albums
A&M Records albums
Albums produced by Dennis Coffey